The following list shows NCAA Division I FBS football programs by winning percentage during the 2010–2019 football seasons. The following list reflects the records according to the NCAA. This list takes into account results modified later due to NCAA action, such as vacated victories and forfeits. This list only takes into account games played while in Division I FBS.


Table 

 Chart notes

 Ohio State had 12 victories vacated during the 2010 season.
 Appalachian State joined FBS in 2014.
 Notre Dame had 12 victories vacated during the 2012 season.
 Georgia Southern joined FBS in 2014.
 Liberty joined FBS in 2018.
 Louisiana had 22 victories vacated by the NCAA between the 2011-2014 seasons.
 UAB dropped their football program from the 2014-2016 seasons.
 UTSA joined FBS in 2012.
 Old Dominion joined FBS in 2014.
 Coastal Carolina joined FBS in 2017.
 South Alabama joined FBS in 2012.
 Texas State joined FBS in 2012.
 Charlotte joined FBS in 2015.
 Georgia State joined FBS in 2013.
 Ole Miss had 33 victories vacated by the NCAA between the 2010-2016 seasons.
 Idaho left FBS after the 2017 season.
 Massachusetts joined FBS in 2012.

See also
 NCAA Division I FBS football win–loss records
 NCAA Division I FBS football win–loss records in the 2000s

References

Lists of college football team records